Cunnersdorfer Wasser is a river of Saxony, Germany. It is a right tributary of the Löbauer Wasser, which it joins near Löbau. It flows through Obercunnersdorf and Niedercunnersdorf.

See also
List of rivers of Saxony

Rivers of Saxony
Rivers of Germany